Architectural mythology means the symbolism of real-world architecture, as well as architecture described in mythological stories. In addition to language, a myth could be represented by a painting, a sculpture or a building. It is about the overall story of an architectural work, often revealed through art.  

Not all stories surrounding an architectural work incorporate a level of myth. These stories can also be well hidden to the casual viewer and are often built into the conceptual design of the architectural statement.

Ancient Greek architecture 

Before 600 BC worship was done in the open, but when the Greeks began to represent their Gods by large statues, it was necessary to provide a building for this purpose. This led to the development of temples.

The ancient Greek temples were often enhanced with mythological decorations from the columns to the roof. The architectural functions of the temple mainly concentrated on the cella with the cult statue. The architectural elaboration served to stress the dignity of the cella.

See also
 Folly

Books 
 Giedion, S.: The Beginnings of Architecture: The Eternal Present: A Contribution on Constancy and Change, New Jersey: Princeton University Press, 1981
Lethaby, William Richard: Architecture, Mysticism and Myth Cosimo (first published 1892), English, 288 pages,  (Online PDF)
 Mann, A.: Sacred Architecture, Shaftesbury: Element, 1993
 Donald E. Strong, The Classical World, Paul Hamlyn, London (1965)

References

External links 
 Bruno Queysanne: Architecture and Mythology (Southern California Institute of Architecture: Media Archive)

Architectural history
Mythography